Hector Nicol (9 November 1920 – 2 July 1985) was a Scottish comedian, singer and actor.

Acting career
Nicol starred in few shows during his career. His most notable role was that of a dying gangster in the BBC Television play Just a Boys' Game (1979) and also in A Sense of Freedom (1981). He also starred in Take the High Road, a Scottish soap opera.

Singing career
Nicol wrote and sang "The Hearts Song" for Hearts, and "Glory, Glory to the Hibees" for Hibs. He also wrote and sang "The Terrors of Tannadice" for Dundee United and "Dark Blue Of Dundee" for Dundee. However, he actually supported St Mirren. His 1984 album, Bravo Juliet!, reached number 92 for one week in the UK Albums Chart.

Influence
His influence was important on Scotland's more recent crop of comedians including Billy Connolly, Des Clarke and Elaine C. Smith.

There are many other famous people who have stated they are fans of Hector including Sean Connery, John Barrowman and Tommy Sheridan.

Personal life
Nicol had three sons, two of whom died tragically. One choked to death while eating, while another was murdered in a senseless attack. Stephen Nicol, age 19, was stabbed to death by a 15-year-old boy at a bus stop in Edinburgh on 8 June 1973. At trial, it was revealed that the perpetrator, George Riddell, was not motivated by any greed or anger, but had simply decided to stab someone. David Brand, Lord Brand sentenced Riddell to indefinite detention for the murder of Stephen Nicol, who had suffered from a chronic illness. Nicol nearly left the entertainment business after his son's murder.

Nicol, who suffered from angina, died at his home in Edinburgh, at the age of 64.

Filmography

References

External links

1920 births
1985 deaths
Scottish male comedians
Scottish male film actors
Scottish male soap opera actors
Scottish male television actors
Male actors from Paisley, Renfrewshire
20th-century Scottish male singers
Scottish songwriters
Musicians from Paisley, Renfrewshire
20th-century Scottish male actors
20th-century Scottish musicians
20th-century British comedians
British male songwriters